George Wright (19 March 1930 – 7 September 2000) was an English footballer who played as a right-back.

Wright was born in Ramsgate, Kent and began his career at Ramsgate Athletic. He played for Margate, where he made 22 appearances, before joining West Ham United in February 1951.

Wright made his League debut for West Ham in an away loss against Hull City on 1 September 1951, along with Margate teammate Doug Bing and Bert Hawkins. He went on to make 161 League, and 9 cup appearances for the east London club, and played his last game for the Irons on 22 March 1958 against Grimsby Town.

He was a part of the London XI team that lost 6–0 to Barcelona on 1 May 1958.

He moved to Leyton Orient in the summer of 1958, and played for Gillingham in 1962–63, before returning to Ramsgate.

References

External links
George Wright at 11v11.com

1930 births
2000 deaths
People from Ramsgate
Footballers from Kent
English footballers
Association football fullbacks
Ramsgate F.C. players
Margate F.C. players
West Ham United F.C. players
Leyton Orient F.C. players
Gillingham F.C. players
London XI players
English Football League players